Jetter may refer to:

 Amanda Jetter (born 1994), American artistic gymnast 
 Bernhard Jetter (1862–1927), German-born soldier in the U.S. Army
 Martin Jetter (born 1959), German businessman

See also
 Jeter, a surname (with a list of people of named Jeter) 
 Jetta (disambiguation)